District Jail Sialkot is an old Jail situated in Sialkot, Pakistan.

See also
 Government of Punjab, Pakistan
 Punjab Prisons (Pakistan)
 Prison Officer
 Headquarter Jail
 National Academy for Prisons Administration
 Punjab Prisons Staff Training Institute

References

External links
 Punjab Prisons (Pakistan)

Prisons in Pakistan